The 2021 Champion Hurdle was a horse race held at Cheltenham Racecourse on Tuesday 16 March 2021. It was the 91st running of the Champion Hurdle.

The race was won by the 11/10 favourite Honeysuckle, ridden by Rachael Blackmore and trained by Henry de Bromhead.
The 2020 runner-uo Sharjah filled second place again, six and a half lengths behind the winner, and the 2020 champion Epatante finished in third place. Blackmore's victory made her the first female jockey to win the Champion Hurdle.

Race details
 Sponsor: Unibet
 Purse: 
 Going:Soft
 Distance:2 miles 87 yards
 Number of runners: 10
 Winner's time: 3:54.63

References

External links
2021 Champion Hurdle at the Racing Post

Champion Hurdle
2021
Champion Hurdle
2020s in Gloucestershire
Champion Hurdle